LIE: Love Intelligence Enmity is a 2017 Indian Telugu-language action thriller film directed by Hanu Raghavapudi, who also wrote the story of the film with Jakka Hariprasad. It was produced by Ram Achanta, Gopichand Achanta and Anil Sunkara under 14 Reels Entertainment. The film starred Nithiin, Arjun Sarja, and debutante Megha Akash. The music was composed by Mani Sharma, while J. Yuvaraj was the director of cinematography. 

The film released, worldwide, on 11 August 2017 to decent reviews from the critics and audience, alike as they expressed it an easy one time watch. The performances (especially Arjun's), story, cinematography, background score, action sequences, editing, and production values were praised. However, the screenplay, direction, love track between the main leads, and climax were criticized. The film failed at the box office miserably incurring losses upto 25Cr.

Plot
The story starts off with a police informer calling up Bharadwaj (Ravi Kishan) with information on criminal Padmanabham (Arjun Sarja) saying that Padmanabham is at a bar wearing a suit. Bharadwaj, along with a few police officers, enters the bar. A man holds a waitress there at gunpoint, and Bharadwaj shoots him, allowing the waitress to leave. 
 
A. Sathyam (Nithiin) is a good-for-nothing son of a widowed mother (Poornima). He is unemployed and lives off of his father's monthly pension. He is unmarried and fantasizes about marrying an American girl. By a quirk of fate, Sathyam, along with a stranger named Chaitra (Megha Akash), who has a dream to win a lot of money, end up in Las Vegas, where they decide to only lie with one another. Shortly after, they start to fall in love with one another through their beautiful lies. At the National Investigation Agency (NIA), a frustrated officer named Bharadwaj (Ravi Kishan) is desperate to nab an elusive criminal named Padmanabham (Arjun Sarja), who has escaped the long arm of the law for 19 years. Padmanabham is a famous Indian ropewalker and magician, but he is also a master of disguise. Thus, the NIA has no idea what Padmanabham looks like. He is now suspected to be residing in the USA. Bharadwaj has drafted a sharp officer named Aadi (Sriram) to discover Padmanabham's hideout and identity by following a suit which he has purchased and is assumed to have an obsession with. The operation of this mission is called Sholay, implying that Aadi is the showman. All along, Padmanabham tries to go after the team, which is trying to trace him, only to end up with Sathyam. Sathyam was a part of this operation the whole time. The rest of the film is about how Sathyam is related to the entire operation floated to crack Padmanabham, and how the hero-villain duo and other characters race against time. In the end, Sathyam kills Padmanabham for good.

Cast

Nithin as Sathyam
Arjun Sarja as Padmanabham, a magician and a intellective skilled  criminal.
Megha Akash as Chaitra, Sathyam's love interest
Sriram as Aadi, undercover Central Intelligence officer
Ravi Kishan as Bharadwaj 
Ajay as Ajay, Padmanabham's henchman
Nassar as Vishwanadham
Suresh as Sathyam's father
Poornima as Sathyam's mother
Brahmaji as Narada
Rajiv Kanakala as Chaitra's father
Prudhvi Raj as Indrudu
Surya as Srihari
Madhunandan as Vennela, Sathyam's friend 
 Chandini Chowdary as Sathyam's proposed bride
Pramodini Pammi as Chaitra's mother
Ashish Gandhi as Cop
Kadambari Kiran as Travel Agent
Jibreel Tracy as Mugger
Jahnavi Dasetty as Chaitra's friend
Appaji Ambarisha Darbha as Painter (Voice-over by Hemachandra)

Soundtrack 
The music was composed by Mani Sharma and was released on Aditya Music Company.

References

External links 

Films scored by Mani Sharma
2010s Telugu-language films
2017 action thriller films
2010s spy thriller films
Indian action thriller films
Indian spy thriller films
2017 masala films
Films about magic and magicians
Films set in the Las Vegas Valley
Films shot in the Las Vegas Valley
2010s spy action films
Indian spy action films